In Etruscan Religion and mythology, Thesan is the Etruscan goddess of the dawn, divination, and childbirth and was associated with the generation of life. Romans identified her with their Aurora and Mater Matuta and Greeks with Eos and Leucothea. In Etruria, she received offerings together with the sun god Usil in the liber linteus. She was especially worshipped at Caere's harbour of Pyrgi, where a temple was dedicated to her and a singular series of ‘‘daybreak antefixes’’ was excavated.

Thesan was depicted with wings and sometimes nude, such as a clay acroterium from Astrone valley.

Etymology

Thesan was depicted on several Etruscan mirror backs, bearing a great pair of wings on her back like many other Etruscan goddesses, especially appropriate to a sky-goddess. One meaning of her name is simply “Dawn”, and related words are thesi, meaning “illumination”, and thesviti, “clear or famous”. The other meaning of her name connects her with the ability to see the future, for thesan also means "divination", as seen in the related Etruscan word thesanthei, “divining”, “illuminating”, or “brilliant”. This relates to her function as a dawn goddess – since divination throws light on the dark future and enables one to see what may happen, like the dawn, which illuminates what was previously dark. She was called by some as a childbirth goddess, as she was present at the beginning of the day, which finds its parallel in the beginning of a new baby's life. Similar to the Roman goddess Lucina, goddess of Light and Childbirth, who brought the infant into the light of day.

Mythology

The Curse of Aphrodite

The Etruscans identified their Thesan with the Greek dawn goddess Eos. In the Greek legend, Aphrodite had found Eos in bed with her lover Ares; to punish Eos, Aphrodite “cursed” her with an insatiable taste for mortal youths, and Eos became infamous for her many young lovers. The Etruscans seemed to quite like these stories and easily transferred them to their dawn goddess Thesan; the stories depicted on the mirrors are generally straight out of Greek myth.

Depictions of Thesan

with Cephalus
On one relief mirror back (kind of a rarity in Etruscan mirrors since the decoration on the back is almost always engraved rather than cast), Thesan is shown in the act of abducting Cephalus, a young man of Athens who was married to the King Erechtheus’ daughter, Procris. Thesan is winged here, wearing a chiton and diagonal himation that flows in the breeze; about her head is a halo, to emphasize her function as a goddess of light. She runs off to the left carrying Cephalus in her arms, who is shown as nude and much smaller than she is. He does not look at all distressed at the situation and he rests in her arms with his right hand on her shoulder. Like many depictions of Etruscan women and their lovers, she is shown as larger and therefore more important or powerful than the man: This has been taken as an indication of the high status of Etruscan women.

The same scene is depicted on a mirror handle in high relief openwork; Cephalus is again quite a lot smaller (and younger) than Thesan, who is not winged this time, but whose cloak billows behind her in the breeze. She smiles down at young Kephalos as She lifts him up, and he is nude save for a short cloak and hunting boots.

with Memrun (Memnon)
Another favorite scene of Thesan/Eos depicts a far more somber affair. When her son Memnon (by Tithonus, another young man she abducted to be her lover, called Thinthun by the Etruscans) was killed in the Trojan War, Eos grieved so terribly that she threatened never to bring forth the dawn again. She was finally persuaded to return, but in Her grief she weeps tears of dew every morning for Her beloved son. One mirror-back shows Her before Tinia (Zeus) with Thethis (Thetis), the mother of Achilles. Both goddesses plead with Tinia to spare their sons’ lives; but both were already doomed to die. The relief mirror mentioned above has been interpreted by some as showing Thesan carrying off the body of her dead son Memnon (who the Etruscans called Memrun). (Different interpretations possible for this mirror, since the figures are not labelled, whereas most Etruscan mirrors with figures do have names engraved beside them.)

with Usil and Nethuns
The Liber Lintaeus connects Thesan with the Etruscan sun god Usil, equivalent to the Greek Helios and Roman Sol. She has her arm around Usil’s back, implying a connection that Helios and Eos do not have. A fourth century mirror now shows her in conversation with both Usil and Nethuns (Etruscan Neptune / Poseidon).

See also

 Aurora 
 Dawn goddess
 Eos
 Etruscan civilization 
 Etruscan religion
 Mater Matuta
 Usil

References

External links

Etruscan goddesses
Etruscan religion
Solar goddesses
Fertility goddesses
Oracular goddesses
Childhood goddesses
Dawn goddesses